Thortveitite is a rare mineral consisting of scandium yttrium silicate (Sc,Y)2Si2O7. It is the primary source of scandium. Occurrence is in granitic pegmatites. It was named after Olaus Thortveit, a Norwegian engineer. It is grayish-green, black or gray in color.

A transparent gem quality example was found in 2004, and reported in "The Journal of Gemmology".

See also
List of minerals
List of minerals named after people

References

Scandium minerals
Yttrium minerals
Sorosilicates
Monoclinic minerals
Minerals in space group 12